The Senior Cup, was formed in 1951 when Ansells Brewery presented Herefordshire FA with the trophy. In the early days the Senior cup became an annual invitation Final. The final often varied in the early years between being a two legged affair or a single match. In 2009 the competition was merged with the much older competition known as the County Challenge Cup, is the county cup for the Herefordshire County Football Association (HCFA). According to the current rules of the competition, it is open to all clubs whose affiliation is with the HCFA. The current holders are Westfields F.C. who won the 2013 competition.

History

The HCFA covers the ceremonial county of Herefordshire. The Cup in its current format was competed in 2009 and was won by Westfields F.C.

Winners

The Senior Cup final was not held in 2014 due to the problems at finalist Hereford United, who were subsequently wound up. The Challenge Cup final was not played in 2020 due to the Covid-19 pandemic.

Westfields have won the competition a record 15 times.

Finals

References

County Cup competitions